There are at least 78 named mountains in Cascade County, Montana.
 Adel Mountain, el. 
 Antelope Butte, el. 
 Antelope Mountain, el. 
 Baldy, el. 
 Barker Mountain, el. 
 Belt Butte, el. 
 Belt Park Butte, el. 
 Big Horn Mountain, el. 
 Birdtail Butte, el. 
 Black Butte, el. 
 Black Butte, el. 
 Black Mountain, el. 
 Blankenbaker Hill, el. 
 Cascade Butte, el. 
 Castle Rock, el. 
 China Mountain, el. 
 Chisholm Mountain, el. 
 Comers Butte, el. 
 Creamery Hill, el. 
 Crown Butte, el. 
 Crown Butte, el. 
 Deer Butte, el. 
 DeLacey Point, el. 
 Dime Hill, el. 
 Eagle Rock, el. 
 Eagle Rock, el. 
 Elephant Head Rock, location unknown, el. 
 Finigan Mountain, el. 
 Fishback Butte, el. 
 Forest Hill, el. 
 Frozen Hill, location unknown, el. 
 Gobbler Knob, el. 
 Gore Hill, el. 
 Harris Mountain, el. 
 Haystack Butte, el. 
 Hill Fifty-seven, el. 
 Indian Butte, el. 
 Iron Hill, el. 
 Iverson Hill, el. 
 Johnson Butte, el. 
 Keegan Peak, el. 
 Lionhead Butte, el. 
 Long Mountain, el. 
 Mahoney Hill, el. 
 Millegan Hill, el. 
 Mission Hill, el. 
 Monarch Mountain, el. 
 Mount Cecelia, el. 
 Mount Pilgrim, el. 
 Neihart Baldy, el. 
 Nipple Butte, location unknown, el. 
 Pinewood Peak, el. 
 Powderhouse Hill, el. 
 Prospect Hill, location unknown, el. 
 Rattlesnake Butte, el. 
 Rattlesnake Hill, el. 
 Red Butte, el. 
 Rocky Butte, el. 
 Saddleback Butte, el. 
 Sawmill Peak, el. 
 Servoss Mountain, el. 
 Shaw Butte, el. 
 Skull Butte, el. 
 Smelter Hill, el. 
 South Peak, el. 
 Square Butte, el. 
 Streeter Hill, el. 
 Sugarloaf Mountain, el. 
 Sullivan Hill, el. 
 Sun Mountain, el. 
 Taft Hill, el. 
 Telegraph Mountain, el. 
 The Sawteeth, el. 
 Thunder Mountain, el. 
 Tiger Butte, el. 
 Turtle Butte, el. 
 Warner Hill, el. 
 Wilson Butte, el.

See also
 List of mountains in Montana
 List of mountain ranges in Montana

Notes

Landforms of Cascade County, Montana
Cascade